Amaranth was a four-masted barquentine built by Matthew Turner of Benicia, California in 1901. Amaranth sailed in the China trade between Puget Sound and Shanghai. She was wrecked on a guano island in the South Pacific in 1913 while carrying a load of coal.

Construction
Barquentine Amaranth Co. incorporated in San Francisco on Sept. 14, 1901 with capital stock of $76,000 and was assigned state corporation no. 33,965. Captain Turner, a master shipbuilder, was known for his Bering Sea pelagic sealing schooners, codfishing schooners, South Seas schooners, and sugar packets. Amaranth measured 1,109 tons, and was a sister ship to Turner's 1,167 ton barquentine Amazon. The ship was named after the amaranth plant.

In 1975, a half-hull model of Amaranth was on display in the San Francisco Maritime Museum. By 1941, the Historic American Merchant Marine project had collected and deposited the complete plans of Amaranth at the US National Museum.

Voyages to China
Amaranth sailed from Astoria, Oregon to Shanghai in 23 days. She also made four voyages under Captain E.C. Boles from Puget Sound to Taku, (Shanghai), "in 100, 110, 118, and 123 days."

Delivery of drydock materials to Pearl Harbor
In April 1910, Amaranth delivered materials for construction of a drydock facility at Pearl Harbor. Amaranth was the fourth deep-sea, cargo-carrying vessel to venture into the newly dredged harbor, where a naval station was planned, having been preceded by the three-masted schooner W.H. Marston on March 8, and the schooner Ariel and bark Marston a few days later.

Shipwreck at Jarvis Island

On 30 August 1913, Amaranth, under Captain C.W. Nielson, was carrying a cargo of coal from Newcastle, New South Wales to San Francisco when she wrecked on the southeastern shore of Jarvis Island. On shore, the Amaranth crew could see the ruins of ten wooden guano-mining buildings, including a two-story house. "The captain and crew took to their boats and landed next morning. The vessel broke up. With salvaged provisions and water, the crew managed to reach Samoa in the two boats 3 weeks later." One lifeboat reached Pago Pago, American Samoa and the other made Apia in Western Samoa.

The Amaranth's scattered remains were noted and scavenged for many years, and rounded fragments of coal from the ship's hold were still being found on the south beach in the late 1930s.  "A memorial cairn and plaque that commemorate the grounding are still present on the island."

Amaranth Monument Plaque

References

External links
Mathew Turner, Benicia’s shipbuilder extraordinaire, by Jerry Bowen

Barquentines
Ships built in Benicia, California
History of foreign trade in China
Hawaii-related ships
Shipwrecks in the Pacific Ocean
Jarvis Island
Maritime incidents in 1913
1901 ships